Bruce Township is the name of two places in the U.S. state of Michigan:

 Bruce Township, Chippewa County, Michigan
 Bruce Township, Macomb County, Michigan

See also 
 Bruce Township (disambiguation)

Michigan township disambiguation pages